Vympel NPO is a Russian research and production company based near Moscow, mostly known for their air-to-air missiles. Other projects include SAM and ABM defenses. It was started in the Soviet era as an OKB 
(experimental design bureau).

History
Vympel started out after World War II as OKB-134, with  leading the team. The first product they designed was the K-7 missile. Their first missile built in serial production was the K-13 (R-13) in 1958. Somewhere between 1966 and 1968 the OKB got renamed to Vympel. In 1977 Matus Bisnovat of OKB-4 Molniya died, and all missile related work was passed to Vympel. G. Khokhlov led the team until 1981, when Genadiy A. Sokolovski succeeded him.

In 1992 the GosMKB Vympel got started on the basis of the OKB and in 1994 Sokolovski became the director of development at the company.

In May 2004 the Tactical Missiles Corporation was formed and Vympel became a part of it, as the design and development facility.

Notable projects

Air-to-air missiles
K-13/R-13 (AA-2 "Atoll")
R-4 (AA-5 "Ash")
R-23/R-24 (AA-7 "Apex")
R-27 (AA-10 "Alamo")
R-33 (AA-9 "Amos")
R-37 (AA-13 "Arrow")
R-40 (AA-6 'Acrid')
R-60 (AA-8 "Aphid")
R-73 (AA-11 "Archer")
R-77 (AA-12 "Adder")

Air-to-surface missiles
Kh-29 (AS-13 "Kedge")
Terra-3 laser

Surface-to-air missiles
 3M9 SA missile (SA-6 "Gainful") for Kub missile system.
 ABM-1 Galosh

References

External links
 «Vympel NPO» official site 

Tactical Missiles Corporation
Guided missile manufacturers
Science and technology in the Soviet Union
Defence companies of the Soviet Union
Aerospace companies of the Soviet Union
Companies based in Moscow
Electronics companies of the Soviet Union
Design bureaus